The 2022 Campeonato Paulista de Futebol Profissional da Primeira Divisão - Série A1 was the 121st season of São Paulo's top professional football league. The competition was played from 23 January to 3 April 2022.

Format
 In the first stage the sixteen seeded teams were drawn into four groups of four teams each, with each team playing once against the twelve clubs from the other three groups. After each team has played twelve matches, the top two teams of each group qualified for the quarter-final stage.
 After the completion of the first stage, the two clubs with the lowest number of points, regardless of the group, were relegated to the Campeonato Paulista Série A2.
 Quarter-finals and semi-finals were played in a single match, with the best placed team playing at home.
 The finals were played in a two-legged home and away fixture, with the best placed team playing the second leg at home.
 In case of a draw in any knockout stage, the match was decided by a penalty shoot-out.
 The two highest-placed teams not otherwise qualified qualified for the 2023 Copa do Brasil.
 The top three highest-placed teams in the general table at the end of the competition who are not playing in any level of the national Brazilian football league system qualified for the 2023 Campeonato Brasileiro Série D.

Tiebreakers
The teams are ranked according to points (3 points for a win, 1 point for a draw, 0 points for a loss). If two or more teams are equal on points on completion of the group matches, the following criteria are applied to determine the rankings:
Higher number of wins;
Superior goal difference;
Higher number of goals scored;
Fewest red cards received;
Fewest yellow cards received;
Draw in the headquarters of the FPF.

TV partners
After several years being broadcast by Grupo Globo (TV Globo, SporTV and Premiere FC), the broadcasting rights of the 2022 Campeonato Paulista were acquired by Record TV, with their streaming app Play Plus also transmitting the matches live. Aside of that, the streaming platforms HBO Max and Estádio TNT Sports (owned by TNT) and the Paulistão official YouTube channel and app (Paulistão Play) also broadcast the matches live. Record and the YouTube channel will broadcast 16 matches of the competitions each, one for each round, while HBO Max and Estádio TNT will broadcast 28 matches each (24 in the first round, one quarterfinals match, one semifinals match and both finals). Paulistão Play will have an offer of all but 13 matches of the tournament (exclusive for HBO Max/Estádio TNT).

Teams

First stage

Group A

Group B

Group C

Group D

Knockout stage

Bracket

Overall table

Top scorers

References

Campeonato Paulista seasons
Paulista
2022 in Brazilian football